Conasprella joliveti is a species of sea snail, a marine gastropod mollusk in the family Conidae, the cone snails and their allies.

Like all species within the genus Conasprella, these cone snails are predatory and venomous. They are capable of "stinging" humans, therefore live ones should be handled carefully or not at all.

Description
The size of the shell varies between 29 mm and 35 mm.

Distribution
This marine species occurs off Fiji, Vanuatu the Solomon Islands, and Indonesia

References

 Puillandre N., Duda T.F., Meyer C., Olivera B.M. & Bouchet P. (2015). One, four or 100 genera? A new classification of the cone snails. Journal of Molluscan Studies. 81: 1–23
 Moolenbeek, R., Röckel, D. & Bouchet, P., 2008. New records and new species of cones from deeper water off Fiji (Mollusca, Gastropoda, Conidae). Vita Malacologica 6: 35–49

External links
 The Conus Biodiversity website
 
 Holotype in MNHN, Paris

joliveti
Gastropods described in 2008